Alanoud, or Al Anoud (Arabic: العنود), is an Arabic name with multiple meanings including "strong-willed", "rain cloud" and "leader of deer"/"unhuntable deer".

Notable people with the name 
 Alanoud Alsharekh, Kuwati women's rights activist
 Al Anoud Al Fayez, Saudi royal and former wife of King Abdullah of Saudi Arabia
 Alanoud bint Hamad Al Thani, Qatari royal and finance executive
 Alanoud Ihab, Iraqi-born Jordainian footballer
 Al-Anoud bint Mana Al Hajri, Qatari royal and wife of Emir Tamim bin Hamad Al Thani

Arabic feminine given names